Mount Belgrave is a prominent rock summit that rises over 1200 m about 1.5 miles west of Mount Creak. The feature overlooks the north side of Fry Glacier at the south extremity of Kirkwood Range. Named after Vince Belgrave, surveyor or leader in several surveys and geodetic projects for NZAP, 1984–1997.

Mountains of Victoria Land
Scott Coast